James Townsend (November 25, 1927 – July 18, 2019) was an American politician. He served as a Democratic member for the 27th district of the Oklahoma House of Representatives.

Life and career 
Townsend was born in Haileyville, Oklahoma, the son of Rose Baker and John D. Townsend. He attended Oklahoma Military Academy. He served under General Douglas MacArthur while serving in the military.

Townsend was a engineer and firefighter. In 1965, he was elected to represent the 27th district of the Oklahoma House of Representatives. He was the majority floor leader for two terms. He left office in 1980, when he was succeeded by Steven C. Lewis.

After leaving office, Townsend was an unsuccessful candidate for the 4th district of Oklahoma of the United States House of Representatives. In the same year, he went to work for the Oklahoma Department of Transportation for two years.

Townsend died in July 2019 at his home, at the age of 91.

References 

1927 births
2019 deaths
Democratic Party members of the Oklahoma House of Representatives
20th-century American politicians
20th-century Members of the Oklahoma House of Representatives
American engineers
20th-century American engineers
Rogers State University alumni
People from Pittsburg County, Oklahoma